Eskimo Pass is a mountain pass in the southern Baffin Mountains, Nunavut, Canada.

References

Arctic Cordillera
Mountain passes of Baffin Island